Julissa is a feminine given name. Notable people with the name include the following:

Julissa (born Julia Isabel de Llano Macedo in 1944), Mexican actress, producer and singer.
Julissa (singer) (born Julissa Arce Rivera in 1976), Puerto Rican singer
Julissa Bermúdez (born 1983), American entertainer
Julissa Diez (born 1989), Peruvian taekwondoist
Julissa Ferreras (born 1976), American politician
Julissa Gomez (1972 – 1991), American gymnast
Julissa Miró (born 1978), Peruvian model
Julissa Nolasco, Puerto Rican politician
Julissa Reynoso (born 1975), American lawyer
Julissa Veloz (born 1988), American musician
Julissa Villanueva (born 1972), Honduran scientist

See also

Feminine given names